Euphyllia divisa (reclassified in 2017 as Fimbriaphyllia divisa), commonly known as frogspawn coral and sometimes misspelled Euphyllia divisia, is a large-polyped stony coral native to the Indo-Pacific islands. It is a commonly kept species in the marine aquarium hobby. The related coral Fimbriaphyllia paradivisa is frequently misidentified as frogspawn leading to some confusion. Fimbriaphyllia divisa has a corallite skeleton with a flabello-meandroid "wall" structure whereas Fimbriaphyllia paradivisa has a tree-like branching structure with separate corallites.

Distribution and habitat
It is native to the Indo-Pacific, Australia, Southeast Asia, the Ryukyu Islands and East China Sea, the Solomon Islands, Fiji, and Palau

References

Euphylliidae
Animals described in 1979